KCVK (107.7 FM) is a radio station licensed to Otterville, Missouri, United States.  The station is an affiliate of Spirit FM, broadcasting a Christian Contemporary Music format with a few Christian talk and teaching programs, and is currently owned by Lake Area Educational Broadcasting Foundation.

History
The station was assigned the call letters KOTT on May 8, 1998.  On October 23, 2001, the station changed its call sign to the current KCVK. On October 3, 2001 the station was sold to Lake Area Educational Broadcasting Foundation.

References

External links
 

CVK